The Polis Akademisi ve Koleji Spor Kulübü - Erkekler Buz Hokeyi Takımı was an ice hockey team of the sports club of the Police Academy and College of Turkey. Polis Akademisi ve Koleji S.K. is a major sports club in Ankara, Turkey. The men's professional ice hockey team participates in the Turkish Ice Hockey Super League and the women's professional ice hockey team in Group B of the Turkish Ice Hockey Women's League.

The Polis Akademisi folded after the 2010 season as they lost the Police as a sponsor. No word if the team will return for the 2012 season.

2009 IIHF Continental Cup 
The Polis SK qualified for the first round of the IIHF Continental Cup because they were the TBHSL Champions. However, the club did not see the results it wanted as the host, and finished 3rd.

Turkey hosted the first round at the Bel-Pa Ice Rink. Here are the teams that competed and the final results.

2009 Round 1 Continental Cup

References

External links
 http://www.tbhf.org.tr (in Turkish)

Sports teams in Ankara
Ice hockey teams in Turkey
Turkish Ice Hockey Super League teams
Ice hockey clubs established in 1996